The 1941 Cal Aggies football team represented the College of Agriculture at Davis—now known as the University of California, Davis—as a member of the Far Western Conference (FWC) during the 1941  college football season. Led by foifth-year head coach Vern Hickey, the Aggies compiled an overall record of 2–2–4 with a mark of 2–1 in conference play, placing second in the FWC. The team outscored its opponents 61 to 47 for the season. They scored more than ten points just twice and allowed double digits only once. The Cal Aggies played home games at A Street field on campus in Davis, California.

Schedule

Notes

References

Cal Aggies
UC Davis Aggies football seasons
Cal Aggies football